Checkpointing schemes are scientific computing algorithms used in solving time dependent adjoint equations, as well as reverse mode automatic differentiation.

References

Bibliography
 

Differential calculus